Nikolay Mateev (born 3 February 1960) is a Bulgarian fencer. He competed in the team sabre event at the 1988 Summer Olympics.

References

External links
 

1960 births
Living people
Bulgarian male sabre fencers
Olympic fencers of Bulgaria
Fencers at the 1988 Summer Olympics
Sportspeople from Sofia